George Washington Campbell (February 9, 1769February 17, 1848) was an American statesman who served as a U.S. Representative, Senator, Tennessee Supreme Court Justice, U.S. Ambassador to Russia and the 5th United States Secretary of the Treasury from February to October 1814.

Biography
Born in the village of Tongue, Sutherlandshire on the north coast of Scotland, Campbell immigrated as a young boy to North Carolina in 1772 with his parents. He graduated from the College of New Jersey (which is now Princeton University) in 1794 and began studying law. He was admitted to the bar in North Carolina and began practicing in Knoxville, Tennessee. He owned slaves.

U.S. House

Campbell was elected to the United States House of Representatives as the Representative from Tennessee's at-large congressional district in 1803. He served in the House from 1805 to 1809, in the 8th, 9th, and 10th Congresses. During the 10th Congress, he was the chairman of the Ways and Means Committee. He was also one of the House managers appointed in 1804 to prosecute the case in the impeachment trial of John Pickering, judge of the United States District Court for the District of New Hampshire, and, later that year, he was also appointed a House manager for the impeachment trial of Samuel Chase, associate justice of the Supreme Court of the United States.

He left Congress in 1809 to become judge of the Tennessee Supreme Court, serving until 1811.

U.S. Senate and ambassadorship

Campbell served as a United States Senator from Tennessee twice, once from 1811 to 1814, having been elected to fill the seat of Jenkin Whiteside, and again from 1815 to 1818. His first service was from October 8, 1811, to February 11, 1814, when he resigned to accept appointment as the United States Secretary of the Treasury. He returned to the Senate on October 10, 1815. He served as the first chairman of the Senate Finance Committee and its predecessor from December 4, 1815, until his resignation from the Senate on April 20, 1818; on this occasion to accept appointment as United States Ambassador to Russia, a position he held from 1818 to 1821. Campbell served as a member of the French Spoliation Claims Commission in 1831.

Secretary of the Treasury
Appointed Secretary of the Treasury by James Madison, Campbell faced national financial disorder brought on by the War of 1812. Congress had failed to recharter the First Bank of the United States after its charter expired in 1811, and appropriations for the war were unavailable, so Campbell had to convince Americans to buy government bonds. He was forced to meet lenders' terms, selling government bonds at exorbitant interest rates. In September 1814 the British occupied Washington, D.C., and the credit of the government was lowered even further. He was unsuccessful in his efforts to raise money through additional bond sales and he resigned that October after only eight months in office, disillusioned and in bad health.

Campbell died in 1848 and is buried at Nashville City Cemetery in Nashville, Tennessee.

See also
List of United States senators born outside the United States

References

Google Books, page 272 for Year 1794

External links

|-

|-

|-

|-

|-

|-

|-

1769 births
1848 deaths
People from Highland (council area)
British emigrants to the Thirteen Colonies
American people of Scottish descent
Madison administration cabinet members
United States Secretaries of the Treasury
Democratic-Republican Party members of the United States House of Representatives from Tennessee
Democratic-Republican Party United States senators from Tennessee
Ambassadors of the United States to Russia
Justices of the Tennessee Supreme Court
American slave owners
American duellists
Politicians from Knoxville, Tennessee
19th-century American politicians
19th-century American diplomats
Princeton University alumni
United States senators who owned slaves